The ATP5MC2 gene is one of three human paralogs that encode membrane subunit c of the mitochondrial ATP synthase.

This gene encodes a subunit of mitochondrial ATP synthase. Mitochondrial ATP synthase catalyzes ATP synthesis, utilizing an electrochemical gradient of protons across the inner membrane during oxidative phosphorylation. ATP synthase is composed of two linked multi-subunit complexes: the soluble catalytic core, F1, and the membrane-spanning component, F0, comprising the proton channel. The catalytic portion of mitochondrial ATP synthase consists of 5 different subunits (alpha, beta, gamma, delta, and epsilon) assembled with a stoichiometry of 3 alpha, 3 beta, and single representatives of the gamma, delta, and epsilon subunits. The proton channel likely has nine subunits (a, b, c, d, e, f, g, F6 and 8). There are three separate genes which encode subunit c of the proton channel and they specify precursors with different import sequences but identical mature proteins. The protein encoded by this gene is one of three precursors of subunit c. Alternatively spliced transcript variants encoding different isoforms have been identified. This gene has multiple pseudogenes.

References

External links

Further reading